Bad Afro Records is an independent record label based in Copenhagen, Denmark.

History

1996-2002 

Bad Afro Records is an independent record label based in Copenhagen, Denmark. The label was founded in 1996 with the purpose of releasing rock’n’roll, punk, surf and garage rock from the Scandinavian countries and Finland. The name, logo and the original slogan “Pushing Scandinavian Rock to the Man!” was inspired by blaxsploitation movies from the early 1970s like Superfly, Foxy Brown and Dolemite.

Bad Afro Records was originally an offshoot of Moshable Magazine (1986–2000). Moshable was an underground punk and garage rock magazine that had focus on the Scandinavian music scene and featured early interviews with bands like The Hellacopters, Turbonegro, Gluecifer and The Flaming Sideburns. In the mid 1990s, the Scandinavian garage rock scene was in full bloom and bands that appeared in Moshable started to be released on vinyl on Bad Afro Records. The original idea and goal was to release 50 7” vinyl singles in 10 years to document the music scene in Scandinavia at the time. This goal was never reached – 10 years later only 45 7”singles had been released.

Bad Afro Records began as a singles club where members could sign up and receive the upcoming six vinyl 7” singles on the label. The concept was inspired by the American label Sub Pop which had started their singles club nearly a decade earlier with great success. In 1999 the first album by The Flaming Sideburns was released and although the singles club continued a few years after that the focus of the label shifted towards full album releases.

In the early years, most releases on Bad Afro Records could be described as garage rock and punk rock with a few excursions into weirder musical territories. At the time the label worked with artists such as The Hellacopters, Turbonegro, The Nomads, The Flaming Sideburns, The Burnouts, Backyard Babies, Gluecifer, Larry & the Lefthanded, The Chronics, Festermen and The Royal Beat Conspiracy as well as many other bands pretty much in the same vein.

2002-2009 
In many ways 2001 to 2004 was the heyday of Bad Afro Records. Scandinavian rock’n’roll was praised all over the world and The Flaming Sideburns were doing very well touring all over the world and was licensed to countries like USA and Australia. In 2003 came the national breakthrough for Bad Afro Records with the release of the Baby Woodrose album “Money For Soul” that featured two major hits on National Radio and was nominated for a Danish Grammy. Baby Woodrose also did a collaboration with Danish beat legend Peter Belli that topped the charts on National Danish Radio and the band played two years in a row on the main stage at the famous Roskilde Festival.

In 2003, Bad Afro re-issued the debut album “Blows Your Mind” by Baby Woodrose which led to some controversy and discussions on freedom of speech for artists. The original artwork was done by the Italian artist collective Malleus and the most important music outlet at the time, Myspace, banned the cover and censored the artwork on several occasions. The artwork was an erotic painting that also made the German pressing plant refuse to print the LP version.

From 2003, the Bad Afro Records slowly took a bend towards psychedelic rock in the sense that most of the new bands that was signed in this period often had a psychedelic edge. Besides keeping on releasing Baby Woodrose albums it also meant collaborations with artists like On Trial, The Setting Son, Dragontears and Sarena-Maneesh.

2009-2012 
After 13 years of "Pushing Scandinavian Rock to the Man!", as the original slogan goes, the label took another turn in 2009 and decided that it was too limiting only releasing music from Scandinavia. In came The Dolly Rocker Movement from Australia and The Mojomatics from Italy and there is releases by US bands Cosmonauts and Royal Baths on the way in 2012.

As a curiosum it can be mentioned that Bad Afro Records since the beginning as a vinyl based record label has had a policy that makes it easy to tell the difference between first print of the LP's or 7” singles and later prints. First print is on black vinyl, second print is on red vinyl, 3rd print is on green vinyl and 4th print is on purple vinyl.

Discography

Albums 
 The Flaming Sideburns – It's Time to Testify...Brothers and Sisters CD (AFROCD001) – 1999
 Union 69 – Holiday 2000 CD (AFROCD003) – 2000
 The Burnouts – Go Go Racing CD (AFROCD004) – 2000
 The Royal Beat Conspiracy – Gala Galore CD (AFROCD005) – 2000
 Festermen – Full Treatment CD (AFROCD006) - 2000
 The Chronics – Soulshaker CD (AFROCD009) – 2000
 The Flaming Sideburns – Hallelujah Rock’n’Rollah CD/LP (AFROCD011/AFROLP011) – 2001
 The Burnouts – Close to Breakevil CD/LP (AFROCD013/AFROLP013) – 2001
 The Chronics – Make You Move CD/LP (AFROCD014/AFROLP014) – 2001
 The Royal Beat Conspiracy – Dig It! CD/LP (AFROCD015/AFROLP015) – 2002
 Sweatmaster – Sharp Cut CD/LP (AFROCD017/AFROLP017) – 2002
 Baby Woodrose – Money For Soul CD/LP (AFROCD018/AFROLP018) – 2003
 Baby Woodrose – Blows Your Mind CD/LP (AFROCD020/AFROLP020) – 2003
 Silver – White Diary CD/LP (AFROCD019/AFROLP019) – 2004
 Baby Woodrose – Dropout CD/LP (AFROCD021/AFROLP021) – 2004
 Viva Vertigo – Viva Viva CD/LP (AFROCD023/AFROLP023) – 2004
 The Defectors – Turn Me On CD/LP (AFROCD024/AFROLP024) – 2004
 Sweatmaster – Tom Tom Bullet CD/LP (AFROCD025/AFROLP025) – 2005
 Slideshaker – In the Raw CD/LP (AFROCD026/AFROLP026) – 2005
 On Trial – Forever CD/LP (AFROCD027/AFROLP027) - 2006
 The Flaming Sideburns – Back to the Grave CD/LP (AFROCD028/AFROLP028) – 2006
 Silver – World Against World CD (AFROCD033) – 2006
 The Defectors – Bruised and Satisfied CD/LP (AFROCD029/AFROLP029) CD – 2007
 Dragontears – 2000 Micrograms From Home CD/LP (AFROCD032/AFROLP032) – 2007
 The Setting Son – s/t CD/LP (AFROCD034/AFROLP034) – 2007
 Baby Woodrose – Chasing Rainbows CD/LP (AFROCD035/AFROLP035) – 2007
 Dragontears – Tambourine Freak Machine CD/LP (AFROCD037/AFROLP037) – 2008
 The Setting Son – Spring of Hate CD/LP (AFROCD036/AFROLP036) – 2009
 Baby Woodrose – s/t CD/LP (AFROCD038/AFROLP038) – 2009
 The Dolly Rocker Movement – Our days Mind the Tyme CD/LP (AFROCD039/AFROLP039) – 2010
 Dragontears – Turn On Tune In Fuck Off!! CD/LP (AFROCD040/AFROLP040) – 2010
 Baby Woodrose – Mindblowing Seeds & Disconnected Flowers CD/LP (AFROCD041/AFROLP041) - 2011
 Baby Woodrose - Love Comes Down CD/LP (AFROCD042/AFROLP042) – 2011
 Telstar Sound Drone - Comedown LP (AFROLP045) - 2013

EPs 
 The Flaming Sideburns – It's Time to Testify...Brothers and Sisters 10” (FRO1001) – 1998
 The Royal Beat Conspiracy – Music to Rock the Nation 10” (FRO1002) – 1999
 The Royal Beat Conspiracy – Shake What You Have Got CD (AFROCD007) – 2000
 The Hellacopters/The Flaming Sideburns – Split CD/10” (AFROCD008/FRO1003) – 2001
 The Maggots – This Condition is Incurable CD/10” (AFROCD012/FRO1004) – 2002
 Sweatmaster – Song With no Words CD/12” (AFROCD022/FRO1006) – 2004
 The Defectors/Powersolo - Snot Dum Split 12" (FRO1008) - 2005
 Pistepirkko/The Others – Ou Wee! CD/12” (AFROCD031/FRO1009) – 2006

Compilations 
 V/A – Pushing Scandinavian Rock to the Man! vol. 1 CD (AFROCD002) – 1999
 V/A – Pushing Scandinavian Rock to the Man! vol. 2 CD (AFROCD010) – 2001
 V/A – Pushing Scandinavian Rock to the Man! vol. 3 CD (AFROCD016) - 2002

Live LPs 
 Baby Woodrose – Live at Gutter Island LP (FRO1005) – 2003
 The Defectors – Live at Gutter Island LP (FRO1007) - 2004
 On Trial - Live at Gutter Island LP (FRO1010) - 2007

7" vinyl singles 
 Trouble Bound Gospel - Shakin' Ray 7" (FRO001) – 1996
 The Hellacopters - Misanphropic High 7" (FRO002) – 1996
 Larry & The Lefthanded - Johnny The Void 7" (FRO003) – 1997
 The Nomads - Love's Gone Bad 7" (FRO004) – 1997
 Turbonegro - Suffragette City 7" (FRO005) - 1997
 Gluecifer - Dambuster 7" (FRO006) – 1997
 The Flaming Sideburns - Get Down Or Get Out 7" (FRO007) – 1997
 Submerged – Mr. Blues 7" (FRO008) – 1997
 The Royal Beat Conspiracy - It's Not Enough 7" (FRO009) – 1998
 The Grinners - Girl From Outer Space 7" (FRO010) – 1998
 The Duplo - Cold Ring of R'n’R 7" (FRO011) - 1998
 Backyard Babies – (Is It) Still Alright to Smile 7" (FRO012) – 1998
 Shake Appeal - Beer is the Way Out 7" (FRO013) - 1998
 Union 69 - Come Smell the Magic 7" (FRO014) – 1999
 The Tremolo Beer Gut - Squaresville 7" (FRO015) – 1999
 Turpentines - Showstopper 7" (FRO016) - 1999
 The Burnouts - No Erection, No Love 7" (FRO017) – 1999
 Festermen – Toelake Snakeman 7" (FRO018) - 1999
 Mother Superior – 3 track EP 7" (FRO019) –1999
 Dialtones – So Many Girls 7" (FRO020) - 2000
 Rockets – Creatures Nite Out 7" (FRO021) - 2000
 Peepshows – Genius 7" (FRO022) – 2000
 The Chronics - Fire Up 7" (FRO023) - 2000
 The Maggots – Gonna Make You Pay 7" (FRO024) - 2000
 Ricochets – Fall Down Dead 7" (FRO025) - 2001
 The Flaming Sideburns - Street Survivor 7" (FRO026) - 2001
 Thee Ultra Bimboos - PMS 666 7" (FRO027) - 2001
 Sweatmaster - Hold It 7" (FRO028) - 2001
 Cosmo Jones Beat Machine - 7" (FRO029) - 2001
 Sewergrooves – I've Got Levitation 7" (FRO030) - 2002
 On Trial - Higher 7" (FRO031) – 2002
 Baby Woodrose - Never Coming Back 7" (FRO032) - 2002
 Sweatmaster – Well Connected 7" (FRO033) - 2003
 Baby Woodrose – Disconnected 7" (FRO034) - 2003
 Silver – Evacuate 7" (FRO035) - 2004
 Peter Belli & Baby Woodrose - Nok Af Dig 7" (FRO036) - 2004
 Boomhauer – Work on a Spell 7" (FRO037) - 2004
 Ghost Rocket – Drug Freedom 7” (FRO038) – 2004
 Baby Woodrose/Sweatmaster – Split 7” (FRO039) - 2004
 Sweatmaster – Dirty Rabbit 7” (FRO040) - 2005
 Slideshaker – Bones 7” (FRO041) - 2005
 Columbian Neckties – Get It For You 7" (FRO043) – 2006
 The Flaming Sideburns – Count me Out 7” (FRO044) – 2006
 The Setting Son – In a Certain Way 7” (FRO045) - 2007
 Baby Woodrose – Coming Around Again 7” (FRO046) - 2008
 Baby Woodrose/Dollhouse – Split 7” (FRO047) – 2008
 Serena-Maneesh – Montrose 7” (FRO048) - 2009
 The Mojomatics – Don't Believe me When I'm High 7” (BARINT001) - 2009
 The Dolly Rocker Movement – Our Brand New World 7” (BARINT002) - 2009
 Radio Saigon – Another Time 7” (FRO049) - 2010
 On Trial – On Trial 2x7” (FRO050) - 2011
 Telstar Sound Drone – Mirror Pieces 7” (FRO051) – 2011

CD singles 
 The Royal Beat Conspiracy – Disco Boy CDs (FROCDS001) - 2000
 The Flaming Sideburns – Loose My Soul CDs (FROCDS002) - 2001
 The Flaming Sideburns – Flowers CDs (FROCDS003) – 2002
 The Royal Beat Conspiracy – Good All Over CDs (FROCDS004) - 2002
 Baby Woodrose – Carry CDs (FROCDS005) - 2003
 Silver – Intimate Cussing CDs (FROCDS006) – 2004
 Silver – Angels Calling CDs (FROCDS008) – 2004
 Silver – Funeral Class One (FROCDS009) - 2004
 The Defectors - It's Gonna Take Some Time CDs(PROMOFRO002)- 2004
 Baby Woodrose – I Can't Explain CDs (FROCDS010) – 2004
 Viva Vertigo – Viva Viva (Edie Sedqwick) CDs (FROCDS011) – 2004
 Sweatmaster – Maggots CDs (FROCDS012) – 2005
 Sweatmaster – Dirty Rabbit CDs (FROCDS013) – 2005
 Slideshaker - Bones CDs (FROCDS014) - 2005
 Sweatmaster – Good looks, Big Deal CDs (FROCDS015) - 2006
 The Defectors – The Final Thrill CDs (FROCDS016) – 2006

References 

 The Rock and Roll Report Indie Label Spotlight is on Bad Afro Records (English)
 Interviews & Artikel : Bad Afro Records :: ox-fanzine.de (German)
 Første led i musikkens fødekæde (Danish)
 Bad Afro Records – interview – diskant.dk (Danish)
  ] (Italian)
 Freak Out Magazine (Italian)

External links 
 The Flaming Sideburns – Blow The Roof – 2001 
 The Flaming Sideburns – Flowers – 2002 
 Baby Woodrose – Pouring Water – 2003 
 Silver – Intimate Cussing – 2004 
 Silver – Funeral Class One – 2004 
 The Defectors – It's Gonna Take Some Time – 2004 
 Sweatmaster – Song With no Words – 2004 
 Sweatmaster – Good Looks, Big Deal – 2005 
 Baby Woodrose – All Over Now – 2006 
 Baby Woodrose – Kitty Galore – 2006 
 Silver – The Personal Decay – 2006 
 The Mojomatics – Don't Believe me When I'm High – 2009 
 The Setting Sin – Soulmate – 2009 
 Baby Woodrose – Twilight Princess – 2009 
 The Dolly Rocker Movement – Memory Lane – 2010 

Danish record labels
Record labels based in Copenhagen
Record labels established in 1996
1996 establishments in Denmark
Companies based in Copenhagen Municipality